The 1978–79 New Mexico State Aggies men's basketball team represented New Mexico State University in the 1978–79 college basketball season. This was Ken Hayes's 5th season as head coach. The Aggies played their home games at Pan American Center and competed in the Missouri Valley Conference. They finished the season 22–10, 11–5 in MVC play. Though they finished second in the conference standings, the Aggies were five games behind Larry Birds No. 1 Indiana State Sycamores. They earned an at-large bid to the NCAA tournament, but fell in the first round to Weber State, a team they had beaten earlier in the season, 81–78 in overtime.

Roster

Schedule and results

|-
!colspan=9 style=| Regular season

|-
!colspan=9 style=|MVC tournament

|-
!colspan=9 style=|NCAA tournament

References

New Mexico State
New Mexico State
New Mexico State Aggies men's basketball seasons
Aggies
Aggies